The BB 25100 is a class of electric locomotives in service with the French railways SNCF, built by Materiel de Traction Electrique (MTE) in 1967. The class was designed by André Jacquemin.

Originally allocated to Chalindrey, they were used on the Dijon to Metz route until supplanted by Dijon-based BB 22200. Subsequently, they operated express passenger and freight services around Dijon and also in the northeast of France. The class was eventually withdrawn by 2006.

4 of the class were sold in 2007 to GFR - Grup Feroviar Român, Bucharest of Romania (25109 and 25123 to 25125). Three have been renumbered to 425 109-2, 425 123-3 and 425 125-8. The fourth loco 25124 is believed to have been purchased by GFR for spares.

References

25100
B-B locomotives
25100
BB 25100
Standard gauge locomotives of France

Passenger locomotives